Christopher J. Lancos (born July 12, 1984) is an American soccer defender who last played for Real Salt Lake of Major League Soccer.

Lancos played collegiate soccer at the University of Maryland, College Park, where he made 93 appearances for the Terrapins from 2002 to 2005, scoring 7 goals and 18 assists.  He was a starting member of Maryland's 2005 College Cup championship team.

He was selected in the fourth round, 41st overall by Real Salt Lake in the 2006 MLS Supplemental Draft, but opted instead to sign with the youth team of Germany's 1. FC Kaiserslautern.  He was allowed to terminate his contract early in January 2007, after about a year with the German side.  He subsequently signed with Real Salt Lake for the 2007 MLS season.

Lancos spent time in the U.S. Residency Program in Bradenton, Florida during 2000 and 2001.  He has been capped numerous times for the United States national youth teams, and was a member of the squad during the 2001 FIFA U-17 World Championship.

Chris Lancos is a current member of SAM.

External links

1984 births
Living people
American soccer players
American expatriate soccer players
Maryland Terrapins men's soccer players
1. FC Kaiserslautern II players
Real Salt Lake players
Expatriate footballers in Germany
Soccer players from West Virginia
Major League Soccer players
United States men's youth international soccer players
People from Glen Dale, West Virginia
Real Salt Lake draft picks
Association football defenders